Birtvisi Natural Monument is a rocky landscape 5 km to the north from village Tbisi in the Tetritsqaro Municipality in Kvemo Kartli region of Georgia, adjacent to the Algeti National Park, south-west of the nation's capital Tbilisi.  Birtvisi rocks elevation 950-1050 meters above sea level.   Scenic landscape with volcanic rocks  in the gorge of Algeti River belongs to outskirts of Trialeti Range.
Formidable natural obstacles of canyons  and cliffs provided ideal location for historic Birtvisi Fortress, now in ruins. Birtvisi Fortress 6-7 km access road starts at the east of the village Partskhisi.

Birtvisi Natural Monument is managed by Algeti National Park administration.

See also 
Algeti National Park
Birtvisi Fortress
Trialeti Range

References

Natural monuments of Georgia (country)
Geography of Kvemo Kartli
Protected areas established in 2016
2016 establishments in Georgia (country)
Tourist attractions in Kvemo Kartli